Puhovski is a Croatian surname. Notable people with the surname include:

 Nenad Puhovski (born 1949), Croatian film director and producer
 Žarko Puhovski (born 1946), Croatian professor, political analyst, philosopher, and intellectual

Croatian surnames